HMS Virulent may refer to:

 HMS Virulent was an Admiralty modified W-class destroyer ordered in 1918 but subsequently cancelled
  was a V-class submarine launched in 1944. She was transferred to Greece in 1946 as Argonaftis and returned in 1958, being scrapped in 1961

Royal Navy ship names